Billboard Top Movie Hits is a series of compilation albums released by Rhino Records in April 1996 featuring recordings popularized through their use in movies released from the 1940s through the 1970s.  Five albums were released in the series, each containing ten songs from a specified five- or ten-year period.

1940s

"I've Heard That Song Before" (From Youth on Parade) – Helen Forrest, Harry James & His Orchestra
"Zip-A-Dee-Doo-Dah" (From Song of the South) – James Baskett
"Swinging on a Star" (From Going My Way) – Bing Crosby, John Trotter, Williams Brothers
"My Dreams Are Getting Better All the Time" (From In Society) – Doris Day, Les Brown & His Orchestra
"Boogie Woogie Bugle Boy" (From Buck Privates) – Andrews Sisters, Vic Schoen & His Orchestra
"You'll Never Know" (From Hello Frisco, Hello) – Dick Haymes & The Song Spinners
"(I Got Spurs That) Jingle, Jangle, Jingle" (From The Forest Rangers) – Harry Babbiyt, Kay Kyser & His Orchestra
"It's Magic" (From Romance on the High Seas) – Doris Day
"Doctor, Lawyer, Indian Chief" (From The Stork Club) – Betty Hutton, Paul Weston & His Orchestra
"As Time Goes By" (From Casablanca) – Rudy Vallee

1950-1954

"The Song from Moulin Rouge (Where Is Your Heart?)" (From Moulin Rouge) – Felicia Sanders, Percy Faith & His Orchestra
"Three Coins in the Fountain" (From Three Coins in the Fountain) – Four Aces, Al Albert with Chorus
"ABA Daba Honeymoon" (From Two Weeks with Love) – Debbie Reynolds, Carleton Carpenter
"High and the Mighty" (From The High and the Mighty) – Victor Young & His Singing Strings
"Ruby" (From Ruby Gentry) – Richard Hayman & His Orchestra
"Secret Love" (From Calamity Jane) – Doris Day
"Ol' Man River" (From Show Boat) – William Warfield
"Anywhere I Wander" (From Hans Christian Andersen) – Julius LaRosa
"Anna" (From Anna) – Silvana Mangano
"High Noon (Do Not Forsake Me)" (From High Noon) – Frankie Laine

1955-1959

"Unchained Melody" (From Unchained) – Les Baxter and His Chorus and Orchestra
"Love Is a Many Splendored Thing" (From Love Is a Many Splendored Thing) – Four Aces, Al Alberts
"It's Not for Me to Say" (From Lizzie) – Johnny Mathis, Ray Conniff
"Moonglow" (Theme from Picnic) – Morris Stoloff and the Columbia Pictures Orchestra
"Tammy" (From Tammy and the Bachelor) – Debbie Reynolds
"April Love" (From April Love) – Pat Boone
"Que Sera, Sera (Whatever Will Be, Will Be)" – Doris Day, Frank De Vol and His Orchestra
"Cherry Pink and Apple Blossom White" (From Under Water!) – Perez Prado and His Orchestra, Billy Regis
"Fascination" (From Love in the Afternoon) – Jane Morgan & the Troubadors
"The Man with the Golden Arm" (Main Title) – Elmer Bernstein & Orchestra, Shelly Manne

1960s

"Theme from A Summer Place" – Percy Faith & His Orchestra
"Exodus" – Ferrante & Teicher
"Theme from Valley of the Dolls – Dionne Warwick
"Jean" (From The Prime of Miss Jean Brodie) – Oliver
"Love Theme from Romeo and Juliet – Henry Mancini & His Orchestra
"Raindrops Keep Fallin' on My Head" –  B.J. Thomas
"Ballad of the Alamo" (From The Alamo) – Marty Robbins
"Hush, Hush, Sweet Charlotte" – Patti Page
"Born Free" – Roger Williams Orchestra
"Moon River" (From Breakfast at Tiffany's) – Henry Mancini & His Orchestra

1970s

"Star Wars (Main Title)" (Album version) – The London Symphony Orchestra
"Midnight Cowboy" – Ferrante & Teicher
"Every Which Way but Loose" – Eddie Rabbitt
"Theme from Shaft" – Isaac Hayes
"Gonna Fly Now" – Bill Conti
"You Light Up My Life" – Debby Boone
"The Entertainer" – Marvin Hamlisch
"I Got a Name" – Jim Croce
"Dueling Banjos" – Eric Weissberg & Steve Mandell
"Theme from Close Encounters of the Third Kind" - John Williams

Movies
1996 compilation albums
Pop compilation albums
Soundtrack compilation albums
Various artists albums